Jim Brady (died 1980), born in Dundee, was a Scottish professional bantam/feather/lightweight boxer of the 1930s and '40s, who won the British (Southern (England) Area) Bantamweight Title, and British Empire bantamweight title, his professional fighting weight varied from , i.e. bantamweight to , i.e. lightweight.

References

External links

Image - Jim Brady
Video - A Thundering Good Fight 1945

Year of birth missing
Date of death missing
Place of death missing
1980 deaths
Bantamweight boxers
Featherweight boxers
Lightweight boxers
Scottish male boxers
Sportspeople from Dundee